The Dâlga is a tributary of the river Olt in Romania. It joins the Olt through the Oporelu Canal, into which it flows near Mamura.

References

Rivers of Olt County
Rivers of Romania